Frances Steloff: Memoirs of a Bookseller is a 1987 American short documentary film produced by Deborah Dickson. It follows Frances Steloff, the founder of the Gotham Book Mart in New York City, a center for avant-garde literature and literati since 1920. It was nominated for an Academy Award for Best Documentary Short.

References

External links

Frances Steloff: Memoirs of a Bookseller at Direct Cinema Limited

1987 films
1987 documentary films
American short documentary films
American independent films
Documentary films about businesspeople
1980s short documentary films
Works about book publishing and bookselling
1987 independent films
1980s English-language films
1980s American films